New York State Route 161 (NY 161) is an east–west state highway located in eastern Montgomery County, New York, in the United States. The route is a two-lane highway known as Mill Point Road, named for a small hamlet situated near NY 161's midpoint. At Mill Point, the road crosses Schoharie Creek. NY 161 was assigned as part of the 1930 renumbering of state highways in New York and has not been altered since.

Route description

NY 161 begins at a five-way intersection in the hamlet of Glen, located within the town of the same name. NY 30A heads southwest to northeast through the junction at a sharp angle, while Auriesville Road splits from NY 30A north of NY 161 and Logtown Road begins straight ahead from NY 161's west end. The route heads to the east as a two-lane highway named Mill Point Road, leaving the populated hamlet for more rural, open areas of the town. After crossing  of rolling farmland, the highway intersects Noeltner Road by way of a Y intersection. The junction once served as the southern terminus of NY 288; however, it now marks the south end of County Route 164 (CR 164).

Past Noeltner Road, NY 161 takes on a more northeasterly alignment, slowly bringing the route down the west side of a shallow valley surrounding Schoharie Creek. At the base of the gully is the small hamlet of Mill Point that gives NY 161 its name. It continues on, crossing the creek and entering the town of Florida before quickly ascending the valley's eastern face.

History
On July 11, 1906, the state of New York let a contract for a project to improve  of highway within the town of Florida to state highway standards. One of the roads improved at this time was the portion of modern NY 161 east of Denise Road. The project cost $29,072 (equivalent to $ in ) and was completed by mid-1908. The 2.74 miles of improved highway were added to the state highway system on July 1, 1908, and legislatively designated as State Highway 299. The section of modern NY 161 west of Schoharie Creek was improved to state highway standards in the early to mid-1920s, while the piece between the creek and Denise Road was rebuilt sometime after 1926. NY 161 was assigned to its current alignment as part of the 1930 renumbering of state highways in New York. NY 161 originally extended further eastward along the current Logtown Road and terminated at NY 162 in the hamlet of Rural Grove.

NY 161A

NY 161A was a short spur in the town of Florida that connected NY 161 to NY 30 just north of the hamlet of Minaville by way of Youngs Corners and Dunlap Roads. The highways were state-maintained by 1926 and designated as NY 161A . The designation was removed .

Major intersections

See also

References

External links

161
Transportation in Montgomery County, New York